Heartbreaker is a studio album by American singer Dionne Warwick. It was released by Arista Records on September 28, 1982 in the United States. Her fourth album with the label, it was largely written by the Bee Gees, and produced by band member Barry Gibb along with Karl Richardson and Albhy Galuten; Gibb and Galuten also served as musicians on the album. Warwick recorded the songs on Heartbreaker during the spring of 1982.

The album sold an estimated three million copies worldwide and ranks as Warwick's highest-charting album in most international territories. It hit #1 in the Norwegian Albums Chart and reached the top five in Sweden, the United Kingdom and in the Netherlands, also entering the top 20 in Austria, Germany, and on the US Top R&B/Hip-Hop Albums. In the US, Heartbreaker was certified gold by the Recording Industry Association of America (RIAA) for sales in excess of 500,000 copies.

The title track, the album's lead single, reached the top of charts around the world and stands as one of Warwick's biggest career hits, reaching number one in Poland, Portugal, Sweden and on the US Adult Contemporary chart. The following two singles were "Take the Short Way Home" and "All The Love in the World," the latter of which reached the  top ten on the UK Singles Chart. The Heartbreaker Demos, a collection of Barry Gibb's demos, was released in 2006.

Critical reception

AllMusic editor Rob Theakston found that "while it lacks the genius and soulful grit of Dionne Warwick's earlier classic work, the album was polished and painstakingly produced perfectly for adult pop stations [...] Starting off with a bang courtesy of the title track, Warwick and Gibb go through all of the motions [...] This is not the most definitive album of Warwick's career, but is definitely one of the few highlights that a pop-heavy '80s afforded her."

Track listing
All tracks produced by Gibb-Galuten-Richardson.

Personnel and credits 
Musicians

 Dionne Warwick – lead vocals
 Barry Gibb – acoustic guitar, backing vocals, horn and string arrangements
 George Terry – electric guitar (1)
 Tim Renwick – electric guitar (2-10)
 George Bitzer – pianos, synthesizers
 Albhy Galuten – pianos, synthesizers, horn and string arrangements, conductor 
 Richard Tee – pianos
 George "Chocolate" Perry – bass
 Steve Gadd – drums
 Dennis Bryon – percussion 
 Joe Lala – percussion
 Anita Lopez – percussion
 Daniel Ben Zebulon – percussion
 Gene Orloff – string contractor 
 Gary Brown – saxophone solo
 The Boneroo Horns:
 Dan Bonsanti – saxophones 
 Neal Bonsanti – saxophones 
 Whit Sidener – saxophones 
 Peter Graves – trombone, leader 
 Ken Faulk – trumpet
 Brett Murphy – trumpet

Production

 Producers – Barry Gibb, Albhy Galuten and Karl Richardson.
 Engineer – Karl Richardson
 Assistant Engineers – Mike Fuller, Andy Hoffman, Nicky Kalliongis, Neal Kent, Dale Peterson and Sam Taylor-Porter.
 Recorded at Criteria Studios and Middle Ear Studio (Miami, FL); Mediasound (New York, NY).
 Mastered at Criteria Studios
 Project Coordinators – Dick Ashby, Marie Byars, Tom Kennedy Robyn Frye-Kove and Holly Ferguson.
 Art Direction and Design – Donn Davenport 
 Photography – Gary Gross

Charts

Weekly charts

Year-end charts

Certifications

See also
 The Heartbreaker Demos

References

External links
Heartbreaker at Discogs

Dionne Warwick albums
1982 albums
Arista Records albums
Albums produced by Barry Gibb